In Rajasthan there are 123 Legal education centers imparting legal education. All law colleges and legal education centres are affiliated with Dr. Bhimrao Ambedkar Law University except constituent part of Government Universities in the state of Rajasthan. Thirty three (33) districts are in state of Rajasthan. Details of legal education centres are as under:-

Ajmer 
Seven (7) legal education are in Ajmer district of Rajasthan.
 Maharshi Dayanand Saraswati University is a state public University.
 Bhagwant University is a state private University.
 Govt. Law College Ajmer

Alwar
Nine (9) legal education are in Alwar district of Rajasthan. 
 B.S.R. Govt. Arts College
 Arya Kanya Vidhi Mahavidyalaya, (college closed from 2010-11) (LE Mtg dated 30.4.2010) Item No. 35/2010
 Raffles University, Neemrana since 2011
 Sunrise University since 2012

Banswara
One legal education is in Banswara district of Rajasthan. 
 Dr. Nagendra Singh College of Law, Bharatiya Vidya Mandir, Banswara (No admission in 2006-07, 2007-08 & 2008-09)

Baran 
There is no law school (legal education centre) in Baran district of Rajasthan.
 No law School

Barmer 
There is no law school (legal education centre) in Banrmer district of Rajasthan.
 No law School

Bharatpur 
Two legal education are in Bharatpur district of Rajasthan.
 M.S.J. Govt. College

Bhilwara 
Three legal education are in Bhilwara district of Rajasthan.
 Acharya Chanakya Law College
 Sangam University
 Shri M. L.V. Govt. College

Bikaner 
Six (6) legal education are in Bikaner district of Rajasthan.
 RNB Global University
 University of Bikaner
 B.J.S.R. Jain College
 Govt. Dunger College
 Gyan Vidhi Mahavidyalaya
 Y. M. Law College (Further no admission.)

Bundi 
One legal education is in Bundi district of Rajasthan.
 Govt. College

Chittorgarh 
Two legal education are in Chittorgarh district of Rajasthan.
 Mewar University
 Ravindranath Tagore Law College, Gandhi Nagar (No admission in 2005-06)

Churu 
Two legal education are in Churu district of Rajasthan.
 OPJS University
 Govt. Lohia P.G.College, Churu

Dausa 
One legal education is in Dausa district of Rajasthan.
 Dausa Law College

Dholpur 
One legal education is in Dholpur district of Rajasthan.
 Govt. College Dholpur

Dungarpur 
 No law School

Hanumangarh 
Two legal education are in Hanumangarh district of Rajasthan.
 N. M. law College
 Swami Keshwanand Vidhi Mahavidyalaya, Sangaria

Jaipur 
Thirty eight (Thirty eight) legal education are in Jaipur district of Rajasthan.
 Amity University, Jaipur established in 2008.
 Dr. Bhimrao Ambedkar Law University
 ICFAI University, Jaipur
 Jagan Nath University, Jaipur
 Jaipur National University, Jagatpura, Seedling School of Law and Governance
 Jayoti Vidyapeeth Women's University
 JECRC University
 Maharaj Vinayak Global University
 Mahatma Jyoti Rao Phoole University (MJRP)
 Maharishi Arvind University
 Manipal University Jaipur
 NIMS University
 University of Rajasthan
 University Law College, Centre II, University of Rajasthan
 University five year law college, University of Rajasthan
 Vivekananda Global University

Jaisalmer 
 No law School

Jalore 
One legal education is in Jalore district of Rajasthan.
 Ashapurna Law College

Jhalawar 
One legal education is in Jhalawar district of Rajasthan.
 Govt. College

Jhunjhunu 
Seven (7) legal education are in Jhunjhunu district of Rajasthan.
 Baba Mungipa College of Law, Pilani
 Mahima Vidhi Mahavidyalaya
 Smt. Pana Devi Rameshwar Lal Sharma Law College, Chirawa
 Seth Motilal Law College
 Rajasthan Law College, Chirawa
 Shri Jagadishprasad Jhabarmal Tibrewala University
 Sridhar University, Pilani

Jodhpur 
Five (5) legal education are in Jodhpur district of Rajasthan.
 Jai Narain Vyas University
 Prof. A.D. Bohra Memorial Women’s Law College, (Old Name-Mahila Vidhi Mahavidyalaya)
 Jodhpur Law College and Research Centre
 Jodhpur National University (JNL)
 National Law University, Jodhpur

Karauli 
One legal education is in Karauli district of Rajasthan.
 Veena Memorial Law College, "College has been closed by LEC Mtg 26.04.15"

Kota 
Six (6) legal education are in Kota district of Rajasthan.
 University of Kota
 Bharat Law College
 Govt. College
 Modi Law College
 Execellent Law College

Nagaur 
Two legal education is in Nagaur district of Rajasthan.
 Sawai Law College, Deedwana
 Shri B.R.Mirdha Govt.College

Pali 
One legal education is in Pali district of Rajasthan.
 Govt. Bangur College

Pratapgarh 
 No law School

Rajsamand 
Two legal education are in Rajsamand district of Rajasthan.
 Dwarkesh Law College, Rajsamand
 Saint Meera Law College, Nathdwara

Sawai Madhopur 
Two legal education are in Sawai Madhopur district of Rajasthan.
 Ranthambore Law College, (no permission for admission from 2009-2010. College closed)
 Shahid Captain Repudeman Vidhi Mahavidyalaya

Sikar 
Five (5) legal education are in Sikar district of Rajasthan.
 S.K. Govt. College 
 Mody University of Science & Technology, Lakshmangarh
 Pandit Deendayal Upadhyaya Shekhawati University
 Shaheed Bhagat Singh Law College
 Rajasthan Law College (closed from 2010-11)

Sirohi 
Two legal education are in Sirohi district of Rajasthan.
 Madhav University
 Government Law College

Sri Ganganagar 
Five (5) legal education are in Ganganagar district of Rajasthan.
 Maharishi Dayanand Law College
 Tantia University
 Seth G. L. Bihani S. D. Law College
 S.G.N. Khalsa College
 Govt. P. G. College

Tonk 
Four legal education are in Tonk district of Rajasthan.
 Banasthali Vidyapith, Niwai
 Dr. Ambedkar Vidhi Mahavidyalaya
 Rajiv Gandhi Mahavidyalaya
 Dr. K.N.Modi University

Udaipur 
Seven (7) legal education are in Udaipur district of Rajasthan.
 Janardan Rai Nagar Rajasthan Vidyapeeth
 Mohanlal Sukhadia University since 1945
 Udaipur College of Law Studies
 Bhupal Nobel’s Law College
 Vardhman College
 Dr. Anushka Vidhi Mahavidyalaya, (No admission in 2005-06)
 Pacific University (India)

References

External links 
 Districts in Rajasthan

India
 
Schools
Lists of universities and colleges in India